The Color Sergeant of the Marine Corps is a billet in the United States Marine Corps held by a non-commissioned officer posted at Marine Barracks Washington. He is responsible for carrying the official Colors of The United States Marine Corps while leading "The Commandant's Four", members of which are part of the United States Marine Corps Color Guard Platoon.

History

The post of Color Sergeant of the Marine Corps was created in 1965 and first held by Shelton L. Eakin, who was killed in action the following year during the Vietnam War.

Duties
The Color Sergeant of the Marine Corps is considered the senior-most sergeant in the U.S. Marine Corps and serves as the Non-Commissioned Officer in Charge of "Parade Four", the U.S. Marine Corps' principal color guard. During state events, he is responsible for carrying the Flag of the President of the United States. The Color Sergeant of the Marine Corps is also expected to serve as an example of correct appearance to all Marines.

Qualifications
The Color Sergeant of the Marine Corps is appointed by the commanding officer of Marine Barracks Washington and applicants from throughout the Marine Corps are considered. He must be a sergeant between 6-foot 2-inches and 6-foot 6-inches in height, meet Marine Corps weight standards, and be eligible for clearance to the Top Secret Sensitive Compartmented Information level. The appointment to Color Sergeant of the Marine Corps is for a two-year, non-renewable term.

List of Color Sergeants

See also
 Colour sergeant

References

United States Marine Corps